Lake View Grange No. 970, also known as the Westport Town Offices and Depew's Roller Rink, is a historic Grange building located at Westport, Essex County, New York. It was built about 1920, and is a two-story, gable front frame building with Colonial Revival style design elements. It is built into a banked site and measures 36 feet by 90 feet. It housed a local Grange chapter from its construction until about 1940; became a roller rink in the 1950s, then a chapter of the American Legion; and after 1971, the Westport town and village offices.

It was added to the National Register of Historic Places in 2013.

References

Grange organizations and buildings in New York (state)
Grange buildings on the National Register of Historic Places in New York (state)
Colonial Revival architecture in New York (state)
Buildings and structures completed in 1928
Buildings and structures in Essex County, New York
National Register of Historic Places in Essex County, New York